In July 2016, the International Union for Conservation of Nature (IUCN) listed 1702 data deficient insect species. Of all evaluated insect species, 28% are listed as data deficient. 
No subpopulations of insects have been evaluated by the IUCN.

This is a complete list of data deficient insect species and subspecies as evaluated by the IUCN.

Blattodea
Miriamrothschildia zonatus

Orthoptera
There are 50 species in the order Orthoptera assessed as data deficient.

Acridids

Tettigoniids

Phaneropterids

Other Orthoptera species

Hymenoptera
There are 316 species in the order Hymenoptera assessed as data deficient.

Colletids

Melittids

Apids

Halictids

Andrenids

Megachilids

Mantises

Lepidoptera
Lepidoptera comprises moths and butterflies. There are 87 species in the order Lepidoptera assessed as data deficient.

Pyralids

Swallowtail butterflies

Lycaenids

Nymphalids

Skippers

Other Lepidoptera species

Beetles
There are 377 beetle species assessed as data deficient.

Geotrupids

Longhorn beetles

Click beetles

Erotylids

Scarabaeids

Other beetle species

Odonata
Odonata includes dragonflies and damselflies. There are 868 species in the order Odonata assessed as data deficient.

Platystictids

Chlorogomphids

Argiolestids

Chlorocyphids

Isostictids

Platycnemidids

Megapodagrionids

Gomphids

Cordulegastrids

Corduliids

Calopterygids

Coenagrionids

Euphaeids

Macromiids

Lestids

Aeshnids

Libellulids

Polythorids

Other Odonata species

See also 
 Lists of IUCN Red List data deficient species
 List of least concern insects
 List of near threatened insects
 List of vulnerable insects
 List of endangered insects
 List of critically endangered insects
 List of recently extinct insects

References 

Insects
Data deficient insects
Data deficient insects
Data deficient insects